Lichenalia is an extinct genus of cystoporate bryozoan belonging to the family Rhinoporidae. It is known from the Upper Ordovician to the Middle Silurian periods, which spanned from approximately 460 to 430 million years ago. The genus had a cosmopolitan distribution, with fossil specimens found in various regions of the world, including North America, Europe, and Asia.

Description 
The colonies of Lichenalia could either have a branched or tube-shaped form, or have an encrusting growth habit. The genus possessed prominent lunaria, which are shield-like structures that protected the zooids, or individual organisms, that made up the colony. The skeleton of Lichenalia was vesicular, meaning that it had a porous texture filled with numerous small chambers. The vesicular skeleton contained tunnels that appeared like ridges on the surface of the colony. The purpose of these tunnels is unknown, but they may have served as brooding chambers for the zooids.

Taxonomy 
Lichenalia was first described by the American paleontologist Edward Oscar Ulrich in 1882, based on fossil specimens collected from the Upper Ordovician rocks of Ohio. The genus was originally classified in the family Fistuliporidae, but subsequent studies have placed it in the family Rhinoporidae.

Paleoecology 
The ecology of Lichenalia is not well understood, but the genus is believed to have been a filter-feeding organism that lived in shallow marine environments. Like other bryozoans, Lichenalia colonies were composed of many individual zooids that were interconnected by tiny tubes. The zooids fed on microscopic organisms that they captured from the surrounding water using a ring of ciliated tentacles called a lophophore. As filter-feeders, bryozoans such as Lichenalia played a role in controlling the population of plankton in ancient marine ecosystems.

Lichenalia colonies could form hollow branched or tube-shaped colonies, or have an encrusting growth habit. The encrusting growth form is particularly common in rocks of the Middle Silurian period. Some species of Lichenalia have been found in association with other reef-building organisms, such as corals and stromatoporoids. This suggests that Lichenalia may have played a role in building or stabilizing reef structures.

Classification 
Lichenalia belongs to the class Stenolaemata within the phylum Bryozoa. The genus is classified in the family Rhinoporidae, which is characterized by a vesicular skeleton with tunnels that appear as ridges on the surface of the colony. Other genera in the Rhinoporidae include Rhinopora, Fistulipora, and Heterotrypa.

Species 
Several species of Lichenalia have been described, including:

 Lichenalia accola
 Lichenalia bisulcata
 Lichenalia compressa
 Lichenalia fastigiata
 Lichenalia insueta
 Lichenalia monolitiformis
 Lichenalia oblata
 Lichenalia robusta
 Lichenalia rotunda
 Lichenalia simplicissima

Distribution 
Fossil specimens of Lichenalia have been found in various parts of the world, including North America (e.g., Ohio, Tennessee, and New York), Europe (e.g., Sweden and the Czech Republic), and Asia (e.g., China and Kazakhstan). The genus has been recovered from rocks of Upper Ordovician to Middle Silurian age, indicating that it existed for a period of approximately 30 million years.

Ecology 
The ecology of Lichenalia is poorly understood, as there is limited information available on its biology and behavior. Like other bryozoans, Lichenalia was a filter-feeding organism that likely lived in shallow marine environments. The genus may have played a role in building or stabilizing reef structures, as some species have been found in association with other reef-building organisms, such as corals and stromatoporoids.

Species

References

Prehistoric bryozoan genera
Cystoporida